Mahmood Farooqui is an Indian writer, performer and director. He specializes in a type of story-telling known as Dastangoi. Farooqui along with his uncle Shamsur Rahman Faruqi, noted Urdu poet and literary critic, revived Dastangoi, the ancient art of Urdu story telling. He was awarded the Ustad Bismillah Khan Yuva Pursakar in 2010 for it.

His book Besieged: voices from Delhi 1857 was awarded the Ramnath Goenka for the best Non-fiction book of the year. This book is a translation of mutiny papers providing a glimpse into the lives of ordinary people who found themselves stuck during the revolt of 1857. He was also a researcher for The Last Mughal, a book by William Dalrymple.

In August 2016 he was found guilty of rape by a lower court, but in September 2017 he was acquitted by the Delhi High Court. The High Court judgment was later upheld by the Supreme Court.

Education
Farooqui completed his schooling from The Doon School and went on to read History at St. Stephen's College, Delhi. He was awarded a Rhodes Scholarship to read History at St. Peter's College, University of Oxford.

Dastangoi

Farooqui began reinventing Dastangoi, the 16th-century Urdu oral storytelling art form, in 2005. Since then, he has performed thousands of shows across the world. Apart from bringing alive the old epic of Dastan-e-Amir Hamza, he has innovated Dastangoi by using it as a medium to tell modern tales. Some of his adaptations include: 
A retelling of Vijaydan Detha's Rajasthani folktale, Chouboli; 
An allegorical take on the trial and incarceration of communist activist Dr. Binayak Sen; 
A presentation on the life and times of communist ideologue and novelist Saadat Hasan Manto; 
An adaptation of Lewis Carroll's classics 'Alice's adventures in Wonderland', and 'Through the Looking Glass';
A collage based on AK Ramanujan's essay, '300 Ramayanas'; 
A collage of stories on the partition of India;
His latest work is Dastan-e-Karan Az Mahabharata, a retelling of the life of Karna based on Urdu, Persian, Hindi, and Sanskrit sources.
Farooqui has, over the years, built a team of dastangos trained by him, including Ankit Chadha, Darain Shahidi, Poonam Girdhani and Himanshu Bajpai.

Books
His publications include the award-winning Besieged: Voices from Delhi,1857, Habib Tanvir: Memoirs, a translation of theatre-director Habib Tanvir's memoirs from Urdu with notes and an introduction, Dastangoi,an introduction to the art of datangoi, and A Requiem for Pakistan: The world of Intizar Husain, a personal exploration of the literary and biographical world of Intizar Husain and brief history of modern Urdu Literary Culture.
He has also authored a wide number of articles- 'Two Intellectuals of Delhi', in The Uprising of 1857, Edited by Rosie Llewellyn-Jones, Mapin Publishing, India, 2017; 'The Police in Delhi in 1857', in Mutiny at the Margins: New
Perspectives on the Indian Uprising of 1857, Volume I: Anticipations and Experiences in the Locality, Edited by: Crispin
Bates, Sage, 2013; 'The Mutiny in Delhi through the Mutiny Papers,’ 1857 Revisited: Myth and Reality, Ed. By Kirti Narain and Mohini C. Dias, Himalayan Publishing House, 2008; Nirmal Verma Ka Aatmbodh, essay in Hindi on the writer Nirmal Verma’s anti-colonial ideas in Nirmal Maya, ed by Madhuker Upadhyaya, Vani Prakashan, 2006; Contributed over a dozen reviews to Biblio: A Review of Books and to The Book Review Regular contributor to the Indian Express and other newspapers on books, history and culture; Weekly Column on Culture and Current Affairs in the newspaper Mid- Day Bombay 2002-7; among many others.

Personal life
Farooqui is married to film director and screenwriter Anusha Rizvi, who directed the 2010 Indian satirical comedy film Peepli Live which explores the topic of "farmer suicides". He is also related to Urdu poet and literary critic Shamsur Rahman Faruqi who is his uncle.

References

External links

 
 
 

Living people
21st-century Indian Muslims
Film directors from Uttar Pradesh
Hindi-language film directors
The Doon School alumni
Alumni of St Peter's College, Oxford
Indian Rhodes Scholars
Indian prisoners and detainees
Year of birth missing (living people)